Stoke is a  civil parish on the Hoo Peninsula in Kent, England, to the south of Allhallows, on the north of the Medway Estuary. According to the 2001 census it had a population of 1,063, reducing marginally to 1,060 at the 2011 census.

The two small villages of Lower Stoke and Stoke (sometimes referred to as Upper Stoke) stand on low-lying fertile farmland that is at most 17 m above highwater.
The farmland descends to the Stoke Saltings – a maze of intricate channels and small islands beloved by wading birds. The church of Saints Peter and Paul is in Stoke; it was an appendage to the Manor of Great Hoo. The building contains some Norman and Early English work dating from 1175. It has no spire.

In an Anglo-Saxon charter Stoke is referred to as "Andescohesham". It was passed with other lands by Eadberht, son of  King Wihtred of Kent to the See of Rochester for "the good of his soul and the remission of sins". In 959, Lower Stoke, then called "Osterland", was granted by Queen Eadgifu to Christ Church, Canterbury.  In Domesday Book it is called "Estoches" and "Stoches".

Due to its low-lying nature, Stoke has often suffered flooding, such as in 1158, 1235, 1309, 1682, and 1735 when ploughmen were swept from their fields as the sea broke through. Also, in 1791, 1854, 1874, and 1897, Stoke was cut off from the Isle of Grain for a week.

In 1720 Manor Farm was leased to Jacob Sawbridge, one of the South Sea Bubble directors.

In 1732 William Hogarth overnighted at the 'Nag's Head' in Lower Stoke. Due to the shortage of beds he had to share a bed.

There was a large airship base nearby at Kingsnorth from which patrols covering the North Sea were launched during World War I. The site is now covered by Kingsnorth Power Station.

Stoke has a private unlicensed airfield, home to Medway airsports  club and previously part of Medway Microlights manufacturing microlight aircraft such as the Medway Executive SLA. Stoke Medway airfield is known in the aviation community as being a particularly challenging airfield to fly from. It is unique in its topography as it is situated parallel to marshes of the river Medway on one side of the runway. On the other side of the runway is an active rail line and high tension electricity pylons. The runway also has a curve along its entire length and is relatively short in aviation terms of only bring approx 450 metres long.

Future proposals
In November 2011, Lord Foster published proposals to improve the transport system of South East England. Under these proposals, called the Thames Hub, new high-speed rail lines would be built connecting Kent and Europe with North London, and the North East and North West of England. The scheme would also involve the remodelling of the Thames Estuary, by the construction of a four-runway airport on the Isle of Grain, partially on land reclaimed from the estuary but including land at Allhallows and Lower Stoke. This plan is controversial.
Residents highlight hazards caused the presence of the wreck of the SS Richard Montgomery with its 1400 tonnes of explosives, just off the Nore, and the natural gas terminals which import and temporarily store 20% of the UKs natural gas. In addition there are 300,000 birds that breed along the flight path. Aviation specialists point to the difficulty in fitting another airport in this crowded airspace.

References

Villages in Kent
Civil parishes in Kent